The German modernist theatre practitioner Bertolt Brecht invented the term and used it in a range of critical and creative projects, including the material that he developed in the mid-1930s for his so-called Tui-Novel—an unfinished satire on intellectuals in the German Empire and Weimar Republic—and his epic comedy from the early 1950s, Turandot or the Whitewashers' Congress. The word is a neologism that results from the acronym of a word play on "intellectual" ("Tellekt-Ual-In").

According to Mark Clark:

Brecht routinely referred to the members of the Frankfurt School, particularly Theodor Adorno, as "Tuis". The corresponding term "Tuism" describes the theory and practice of the Tui-intellectual.

References

Sources

 Jay, Martin (1996). The Dialectical Imagination: A History of the Frankfurt School and the Institute of Social Research, 1923–1950. Weimar & Now: German Cultural Criticism series. New ed. Berkeley: University of California Press. .
 Kuhn, Tom and David Constantine, eds. (2004). Collected Plays: Eight. By Bertolt Brecht. Bertolt Brecht: Plays, Poetry, Prose Series. London: Methuen. .
 Leming, Warren (June 2005). "Tui Tsunami: Brecht Reception and Homeland Insecurity". Communications from the International Brecht Society 34: 43–45.

Academia
Bertolt Brecht theories and techniques
Critical theory
Frankfurt School
Marxist theory
Intellectualism